Alexander Davidovich (אלכסנדר דוידוביץ; born August 11, 1967) is an Israeli former Olympic wrestler.

He was originally from Kharkov, the Soviet Union, and emigrated to Israel in 1991.

Wrestling career
Davidovich competed for Israel at the 1992 Summer Olympics in Barcelona, Spain, in wrestling at the age of 24.  He wrestled in the Men's Featherweight, Greco-Roman competition, and lost to Sergey Martynov of Russia (who won the bronze medal) in Round One, coming in tied for 6th, and Shigeki Nishiguchi of Japan in Round Two, coming in tied for 7th.

References 

Wrestlers at the 1992 Summer Olympics
Israeli male sport wrestlers
1967 births
Living people
Olympic wrestlers of Israel
Sportspeople from Kharkiv
Soviet emigrants to Israel